The Polk Correctional Institution  is a state prison for men located in Polk City, Polk County, Florida, owned and operated by the Florida Department of Corrections.  This facility has a mix of security levels, including minimum, medium, and close, and houses adult male prisoners.  Polk first opened in 1978 and has a maximum capacity of 1208 prisoners.

References

Prisons in Florida
Buildings and structures in Polk County, Florida
1978 establishments in Florida